Newburgh Area Transit (also known as the Newburgh-Beacon Bus Corporation) is Newburgh, New York's bus service. Service is operated by Leprechaun Lines, however buses are owned by Transit Orange, the coordinator of public transportation for various agencies operating in Orange County, New York.

Routes

Route Map 
Newburgh Area Transit Route Map

Route List

Fares 

 Adult $1.50
 Disabled, student and senior $ .75
 Transfers (at Broadway and Liberty) $ .50

Fleet

References

External links 
 Official Site

Transportation in Orange County, New York
Newburgh, New York